Jack Parker Halliday (June 5, 1928 – May 23, 2000) was an American football tackle who played one season with the Los Angeles Rams of the National Football League. He was drafted by the Baltimore Colts in the fifth round of the 1950 NFL Draft. He played college football at Southern Methodist University and attended Woodrow Wilson High School in Dallas, Texas.

References

External links
Just Sports Stats

1928 births
2000 deaths
Players of American football from Dallas
American football tackles
SMU Mustangs football players
Los Angeles Rams players